François Poullain de la Barre (July 1647 – 4 May 1723) was an author, Catholic priest, and a Cartesian philosopher.

Life
François Poullain de la Barre was born on July 1647 in Paris, France, to a family with judicial nobility. He added "de la Barre" to his name later in life. After graduating in 1663 with a master of arts, he spent three years at the College of Sorbonne where he studied theology. In 1679, he became an ordained Catholic priest. From 1679 to 1688, he led two modest parishes, Versigny and La Flamengrie, in Picardy in northern France.

In 1688, Poullaine de la Barre left Picardy and the priesthood to return to Paris. At the time the Catholic Church was critical of Cartesianism. By 1689 he moved to Geneva where he converted to Calvinism, a branch of Protestantism. The following year, he married Marie Ravier. After a year as a tutor, he got a position teaching at a local Genevan university. After the Edict of Fontainebleau revoked the Edict of Nantes, he was exiled in the Republic of Geneva, where he obtained the citizenship (bourgeoisie) in 1716. He spent the remainder of his life in Geneva, where he died on 4 May 1723.

Work 
During a physiology conference in 1667 a friend of Poullain de la Barre introduced him to Cartesianism, the philosophy of René Descartes. Poullain de la Barre later adopted the philosophy and applied Cartesian principles to feminist thought and wrote many texts of social philosophy which denounced injustice against woman and by the inequality of the female condition. He opposed the discrimination women experienced and championed social equality between women and men.

Six years after his introduction to Cartesianism, Poullain de la Barre published a three part series on the female condition. In 1673 he published On the Equality of the Two Sexes: A Physical and Moral Discourse, Which Shows That it is Important to Rid Oneself of  Prejudice, which argued that the difference between men and women goes beyond the body, but is in the "constitution of the body". He rejected the idea that the minds of men and women differ, historically proclaiming "the mind has no sex". In claiming sexual difference lies in part through the "constitution of the body", Poullain de la Barre argued the unequal treatment that women experience in religious and educational instruction, and the effects of the environment, create a perceived apparent innate difference between the sexes. In his assessment, this does not have a natural basis, it is not essential nor is it innate, but proceeds from cultural prejudice, and can be understood as social constructionist. Poullain de la Barre advocated for female education, emphasizing that women should receive a true and quality education. He also asserted that all careers, including scientific ones, should be open to them.

In 1674, he published On the Education of Ladies: To Guide the Mind in Sciences and Morals, continuing his reflection on the education of women, but utilizing Socratic dialogue. He addresses the historical constrains of the time. In 1675 François Poullain de la Barre published the third in his series, On the Excellence of Men: Against the Equality of the Sexes". The title was sarcastic; the book was a rebuttal of those opposed to gender equality.

Responses and critiques 
Opinions about Poullain de la Barre's place in the history of feminism vary considerably, but his theories have often been used by others, such as Jean-Jacques Rousseau. Pierre Bayle has advanced the theory that Poullain may have refuted his own thesis because he felt threatened, but the arguments antifeminists advanced are doubtful of this refutation.

Simone de Beauvoir includes a quotation from Poullain de la Barre in an epigraph to The Second Sex  in 1949: "All that has been written about women by men should be suspect, for the men are at once judge and party."

Works 
 De l’Éducation des dames pour la conduite de l’esprit dans les sciences et dans les mœurs, Paris, J. Du Puis, 1674
 De l’Excellence des hommes contre l’égalité des sexes, Paris, J. Du Puis, 1675
De l’Égalité des deux sexes, discours physique et moral où l’on voit l’importance de se défaire des préjugez, Paris, J. Du Puis, 1676
 De l’Égalité des deux sexes, discours physique et moral où l’on voit l’importance de se défaire des préjugez, 2nd edition, Paris, 1679 (annotated transcript in modern French spelling)
La Doctrine des protestans sur la liberté de lire l’Ecriture sainte, le service divin en langue entenduë, l’invocation des saints, le sacrement de l’Eucharistie, Genève, 1720.

References

Further reading
Studies, critical editions, and biographies
 Madeleine Alcover, Poullain de la Barre : une aventure philosophique, Paris ; Seattle, Papers on French seventeenth century literature, 1981.
 Elsa Dorlin, L’Évidence de l’égalité des sexes. Une philosophie oubliée du XVIIe, Paris L’Harmattan, 2001 .
 Christine Fauré, Poullain de la Barre, sociologue et libre penseur, Corpus n° 1, 1985 pp. 43–51.
 Geneviève Fraisse, Poullain de la Barre, ou le procès des préjugés, Corpus n° 1, 1985 pp. 27–41.
 Marie-Frédérique Pellegrin, ed. François Poullain de la Barre, De l'égalité des deux sexes; De l'éducation des dames; De l'excellence des hommes, Paris Vrin, 2011.
 Siep Stuurman, Social Cartesianism: François Poullain de la Barre and the origins of the enlightenment, Journal of the history of ideas, 1997, vol. 58, no4, pp. 617–640.
 Siep Stuurman, François Poulain de la Barre and the Invention of Modern Equality, Cambridge (Mass.), Harvard University Press, 2004 .
 Desmond Clarke (2014). François Poulain de la Barre. The Stanford Encyclopedia of Philosophy, Edward N. Zalta (ed.), URL = <https://plato.stanford.edu/archives/spr2014/entries/francois-barre/>.
 Siep Stuurman (1997). Social Cartesianism: François Poulain de la Barre and the Origins of the Enlightenment. Journal of the History of Ideas 58(4), 617-640. doi:10.2307/3653963
 Anthony J. La Vopa (2010). Sexless Minds at Work and at Play: Poullain de la Barre and the Origins of Early Modern Feminism. Representations 109(1), 57-94. doi:10.1525/rep.2010.109.1.57
 Marcelle Maistre Welch, ed., translation by Vivien Bosley (2002). Three Cartesian feminist treatises. Chicago: University of Chicago Press.

External links 
 Siep STUURMAN: François Poulain de la Barre and the Invention of Modern Equality. Cambridge (Mass.), Harvard University Press, 2004, X-361 pages, [a book review] by Marie-Frédérique Pellegrin and Nicole Pellegrin
 XVIIIème siècle: La femme entre nature et société on Thucydide

 

1647 births
1723 deaths
17th-century philosophers
Converts to Calvinism from Roman Catholicism
Feminist philosophers
French feminists
French philosophers
Philosophers from the Republic of Geneva
Writers from the Republic of Geneva
French Protestants
Male feminists
Calvinist and Reformed philosophers
Writers from Paris
French male non-fiction writers
17th-century male writers
Cartesianism